Polaskia chende is a succulent cactus native to a small area of mountains of northern Oaxaca and southern Puebla, Mexico. It grows in xerophytic shrubland between 1,500 and 2,000 meters above sea level.

Description

References

Echinocereeae
Flora of Mexico